Mihai Tararache (born 25 October 1977) is a retired Romanian footballer who last played as a midfielder for Gloria Bistriţa, Dinamo București, Grasshoppers, FC Zürich, and MSV Duisburg.

International career
Tararache played four matches for Romania, making his debut when he came as a substitute and replaced Dorinel Munteanu in the 57th minute of a friendly which ended 2–2 against Slovenia. His following game was also a friendly, a 3–0 victory against Georgia, and the last two games were a 1–1 against Armenia and a 2–0 victory against Andorra at the 2006 FIFA World Cup qualifiers.

Honours
Gloria Bistrița
Cupa României: 1993–94
Grasshoppers
Swiss Championship: 2000–01, 2002–03
FC Zürich
Swiss Super League: 2005–06
Swiss Cup: 2004–05

References

External links
 
 
 

1977 births
Living people
Association football midfielders
Romanian footballers
Romania international footballers
Romania under-21 international footballers
Romanian expatriate footballers
FC Dinamo București players
ACF Gloria Bistrița players
Grasshopper Club Zürich players
MSV Duisburg players
FC Zürich players
Expatriate footballers in Switzerland
Expatriate footballers in Germany
Swiss Super League players
Liga I players
Bundesliga players
2. Bundesliga players
Footballers from Bucharest